Conotton Creek is a tributary of the Tuscarawas River, 38.7 miles (62.3 km) long, in eastern Ohio in the United States.  Via the Tuscarawas, Muskingum and Ohio Rivers, it is part of the watershed of the Mississippi River, draining an area of 286 square miles (741 km²) in Carroll, Harrison and Tuscarawas County, Ohio.  The source is at 1240 feet and the mouth is at 874 feet. Dover Dam, downstream on the Tuscarawas river, is normally dry, but can impound a reservoir on Conotton and tributaries to a pool elevation of 916 feet for downstream flood control by the Corps of Engineers.  From its source in eastern Harrison County, Ohio the creek flows west northwest through Jewitt, Scio, Conotton, Bowerston, Leesville, Sherrodsville, New Cumberland and Somerdale before reaching its mouth in central Tuscarawas County, Ohio. The Wheeling and Lake Erie Railway is situated in the valley.  Ohio State Route 151 runs in the valley from near the source to Bowerston.  Ohio State Route 212 run along the valley from Bowerston to the mouth.  The Conotton Creek Trail runs from Bowerston to Jewett.

The stream was declared navigable by the Ohio legislature in 1808, but the act was repealed in 1816, probably to allow the construction of mill dams.

Variant names

According to the Geographic Names Information System, Conotton Creek has also been known historically as:
Connotten Creek
Connotton  Creek
Conolton  Creek
Conoten Creek
Gutgatsink Creek
Kannotten  Creek
Kennottenhead Creek
Knottenhead Creek
One Leg Creek

Conotton Creek was known in the 19th century as One Leg Creek, named for an Indian who lived near its mouth.

Named Tributaries and sub-Tributaries

Note A
Dover Dam , on Tuscarawas River is normally dry, but can inundate this waterway to a pool elevation of 916 feet for downstream flood control by the corps of engineers.

Note B
Atwood Dam , near the mouth of Indian Fork, impounds Atwood Lake to a normal pool elevation of 928 feet and a maximum elevation of 941 feet on this waterway.

Note C
Leesville Dam sits on McGuire Creek and impounds Leesville Lake to a normal pool elevation of 963 feet and a maximum elevation of 977.5 feet on this waterway.

See also
List of rivers of Ohio
Conotton Valley Union Local School District
Conotton Creek Trail

References

Rivers of Ohio
Muskingum River
Rivers of Carroll County, Ohio
Rivers of Harrison County, Ohio
Rivers of Tuscarawas County, Ohio